Vision Towards Essence is a live album of solo piano by Muhal Richard Abrams released on the Pi Recordings label in 2007.

Reception

The AllMusic review by Thom Jurek states "This is indeed one of the most important records ever released by this great man". The Penguin Guide to Jazz wrote that "Part 1" "has tentative moments, areas of slow transition which are slightly dull on first hearing though their logic becomes clearer over time. The other two parts are flawless".

Track listing
 "Part 1" - 20:06
 "Part 2" - 18:23
 "Part 3" - 20:16
 
All compositions by Muhal Richard Abrams
Recorded live at the Guelph Jazz Festival, Guelph, Canada on September 11, 1998.

Personnel
Muhal Richard Abrams - piano

References

Muhal Richard Abrams albums
2007 live albums
Pi Recordings live albums
Solo piano jazz albums